Arka may refer to:

 Arka, Hungary, a village in Borsod-Abaúj-Zemplén county, Hungary
 Arka, Iran, village in Mazandaran Province, Iran
 Arka (monument), a monument in Klaipėda, Lithuania
 Arka Media Works, Indian film production company
 Arka Gdynia, Polish football club, based in Gdynia, Poland
 RC Arka Gdynia, Polish rugby union club based in Gdynia, Poland
 Arka Keshari Deo, Indian politician
 Arka Noego, a war pinnace in the Polish-Lithuanian Commonwealth Navy that played an important role in two naval battles of the Polish–Swedish War (1626–1629)
Arka Sıradakiler, Turkish teen drama series on "Fox Turkey"
Arka Sokaklar, television crime series on Turkish "Kanal D"
 Alternate name for Surya, the sun god in Hindu religion
 One of a pair of Andean panpipes siku

See also
 Arkas (disambiguation)
 Arqa, a village in Lebanon